Julie Louise Bibault de Misery née de Chemault (1732-1804) was a French court official.  She was the Première femme de Chambre to the queen of France between 1765 and 1786 (first to Marie Leczinska, then to Marie Antoinette).

Life
Julie de Misery was the daughter of Jacques and Marguerite de Beaucousin and married the court official Charles François Bibault de Misery in 1750.

She was named chamber maid to queen Marie Leczinska and succeeded her aunt Marie Marguerite Bibault as Première femme de Chambre in 1765. After the queen's death in 1768, she was transferred to the household of Marie Antoinette in 1770. Marie Antoinette called her as l'impératrice reine ('Empress Queen').  

She was pointed out as a political intriguer at court, and claimed to be an ally of Paul François de Quelen de la Vauguyon and an agent of the Jesuits and the Devots. Julie de Misery was implicated in the Affair of the Diamond Necklace by Jeanne de Valois-Saint-Rémy, who claimed her to have been her contact at court.

In 1775, the office of Première femme de Chambre was split in four, between de Misery and her three deputies Henriette Campan, Marie-Élisabeth Thibault and Quelpée La Borde Regnier de Jarjayes, who took turns serving: they were all still in service when the queen's household was dissolved in 1792, at that time in supervision of six chamber maids (femme du chambre).

Fiction
She was portrayed in The Queen's Necklace by Alexandre Dumas.

References 

1732 births
1804 deaths
French courtiers
Household of Marie Antoinette
Maids
Household of Marie Leszczyńska